James Kavanaugh (September 17, 1928 – 29 December 2009) was an American Catholic priest, author, and poet best remembered for an iconoclastic call for reform published in 1967.

Born in Kalamazoo, Michigan, and ordained in 1954, Kavanaugh served as a parish priest in Lansing and Flint, Michigan before earning a doctorate at the Catholic University of America in Washington, D.C. His 1967 book, A Modern Priest Looks at His Outdated Church,  became a national bestseller.

References

External links

2009 deaths
1928 births
20th-century American Roman Catholic priests
American Christian writers
20th-century American poets
Catholic University of America alumni
21st-century American Roman Catholic priests